Fort Loudoun Lake is a reservoir in east Tennessee on the upper Tennessee River, extending about  along the river upstream from Fort Loudoun Dam, at Lenoir City, to Knoxville.

Fort Loudoun Reservoir takes its name from the 18th-century British fort built on a nearby site during the French and Indian War. The fort was named for John Campbell, the fourth Earl of Loudoun, commander of British forces in North America at the time.

Fort Loudoun is a popular recreation destination, known for bass fishing, boating, and birdwatching. The tailwater area immediately below the dam is an excellent site for viewing a variety of waterbirds, including herons, cormorants, gulls, osprey, and bald eagles.

The reservoir is connected by a short canal to Tellico Reservoir on the nearby Little Tennessee River. Water is diverted through the canal to Fort Loudoun for power production. The canal also offers commercial barges access to Tellico without the need for a lock. Barges passing through the Fort Loudoun lock carry about half a million tons of cargo a year.

In popular culture
The reservoir is mentioned in the Knoxville-based V-Roys song "Over the Mountain".

See also
Dams and reservoirs of the Tennessee River

References

Tennessee River
Reservoirs in Tennessee
Tennessee Valley Authority
Bodies of water of Blount County, Tennessee
Bodies of water of Knox County, Tennessee
Bodies of water of Loudon County, Tennessee
Tourist attractions in Blount County, Tennessee
Tourist attractions in Knox County, Tennessee
Tourist attractions in Loudon County, Tennessee